Down To Lunch (also known as DTL) was a social hangout app used by college students around the world to hang out with their friends.  The app functions by allowing users to press a button which notifies friends they want to get lunch and friends can reply back and join.

After being adopted by college students around the world, Down To Lunch hit No. 1 in the Apple App Store Social Rankings (#2 App Store Overall Rankings) and was featured in many international media outlets including Forbes and a New York Times cover story on the front page of the business section.

Down To Lunch was created by Stanford college friends Nikil Viswanathan and Joseph Lau.

History 
After moving to San Francisco, Viswanathan and Lau said they were "working all the time and missed seeing their friends" so they created Down To Lunch as a solution to that.  The app rapidly gained popularity and was used by college students around the world. The application was originally built for the iPhone and an Android version was subsequently released. Down To Lunch spread across colleges and would often be widely used on a campus within a day.

References 

Mobile social software